Edmundo Espino (July 19, 1894 – December 24, 1964) was a Mexican film actor.

Selected filmography

References

Bibliography 
 Rogelio Agrasánchez. Guillermo Calles: A Biography of the Actor and Mexican Cinema Pioneer. McFarland, 2010.

External links 
 

1894 births
1964 deaths
Mexican male film actors
People from Zacatecas